Welcome Back is the third studio album by American rapper Mase, released August 24, 2004. The album debuted at No. 4 on the charts, selling 188,000 copies in the first week. The album would eventually go Gold, selling 559,000 copies in the United States. 

This was Mase's first album to not have a Parental Advisory warning, and his first official studio release since 1999's Double Up. "Welcome Back" samples the Welcome Back, Kotter theme song.

Critical reception

Welcome Back received mixed reviews from music critics. AllMusic's David Jeffries said, "Welcome Back runs out of steam toward the end, and spreading out some of the "don't sleep on this" material from the beginning would've worked wonders. It makes this the least necessary Mase album, but half the tracks point to a future that is brighter than ever." Jon Caramanica, writing for Rolling Stone, found Mase's delivery lacking in quality after years away from the rap game and focusing on religion. Kelefa Sanneh from The New York Times said that despite the production in "Breathe, Stretch, Shake" and "Do You Remember" giving him support to lace his flow on the beat, he felt Mase's religious outlook held him back when delivering "lousy similes" about the Bible and brushing women and former friends aside without a response, calling Welcome Back "a surprisingly tepid collection that might have benefited from a bit more preaching, or at least a bit more passion."

Track listing

Charts

Weekly charts

Year-end charts

Certifications

References

External links

2004 albums
Albums produced by Rick Rock
Bad Boy Records albums
Mase albums